Woodrow is an unincorporated rural hamlet with a U.S. Post Office, located in Washington County, Colorado, United States.  The Woodrow Post Office serves ZIP Code 80757.

The post office at Woodrow has been in operation since 1913. The community was named after Woodrow Wilson, 28th President of the United States.

Geography 
Woodrow is located at  (39.988169,-103.591633).

References 

Unincorporated communities in Washington County, Colorado
Unincorporated communities in Colorado